The Palawan scops owl (Otus fuliginosus) is an owl endemic to the Philippines only being found on the island of Palawan.  It is found on tropical moist lowland forest. It is threatened by habitat loss.

Description 
EBird describes the bird as "A fairly small owl of lowland forest. Dark brown above with a white bar behind the shoulder, and paler and warmer brown below with black marks. Note the wide, shallow V-shape stretching from between the eyes out to the ends of the prominent ear tufts, and the dark facial shield incompletely bordered with white below. Eyes are deep orange. Similar to Mantanani Scops-Owl, which only occurs on small offshore islands off Palawan, but differs in eye color. Voice is a low rasping croak, “gruk grrrrrrrrr."

Habitat and Conservation Status 
Its habitat is in tropical moist lowland  primary and secondary forest and even mixed cultivated areas – as long as there are still trees.

IUCN has assessed this bird as near threatened with the population being estimated at 10,000 to 19,999 mature individuals remaining. This species' main threat is habitat loss with wholesale clearance of forest habitats as a result of legal and illegal logging, mining and conversion into farmlands through slash-and-burn or other methods.

References

BirdLife Species Factsheet
http://www.owlpages.com/owls.php?genus=Otus&species=fuliginosus

Palawan scops owl
Birds of Palawan
Endemic birds of the Philippines
Palawan scops owl